The Reverend Ioan Sauca (born 10 April 1956) is the acting general secretary of the World Council of Churches (WCC). He assumed the office on 1 April 2020 after Reverend Olav Fykse Tveit resigned on 31 March 2020. He is to hold the office until the next World Council of Churches (WCC) committee meeting in 2021, was the Deputy secretary general in 2020.

A senior priest from the Orthodox Church in Communist Romania, he was a professor of Ecumenical Theology in the Bossey Ecumenical Institute. He has been professor since 1998 and was the director of the Institute in 2001.

Biography
Sauca was born in Valea Mare, Caraș-Severin County. He attended the Graduate School at the Bossey Ecumenical Institute in 1984–1985 and went on to obtain his Ph.D. of Theology in 1987 from the University of Birmingham with a thesis on 'The Missionary Implications of Eastern Orthodox Ecclesiology'.

Sauca taught mission Ecumenical at the School of Theology in Sibiu. He later served as head of the Romanian Orthodox Church's Department of Press and Communication when it was newly established.

Sauca joined the World Council of Churches in 1994 as executive secretary for the Orthodox Studies and Relationship in Mission.

On 2 March 2022, Sauca wrote an open letter to Patriarch Kirill of Moscow, saying that he received numerous letters asking him to "approach Patriarch Kirill to mediate so that the war can be stopped and the suffering ended." Referring to the 2022 Russian invasion of Ukraine, Sauca continued, "Please, raise up your voice and speak on behalf of the suffering brothers and sisters, most of whom are also faithful members of our Orthodox Church."

Publications
Sauca has many publication in five different languages. Some of his publications are:
 Orthodoxy and Cultures, probed the relationship of the Gospel to cultures (1996)
 Explored prospects for Building Bridges: Between the Orthodox and Evangelical Traditions (2012).
 The Church beyond our boundaries and the ecumenical vocation of Orthodoxy
 The authority to serve in a community of love: An orthodox perspective on authority in the Church
 Santiago de Compostela - Ein wichtiger Schritt auf dem Weg zu umfassender christlicher Koinonia; Growing together into full koinonia – Orthodox considerations
 The development of the Sacrament of Baptism and its practice during centuries
 Orthodox considerations on the ecumenical document BEM
 Eglise locale
 The meaning of the veneration of icons (in Romanian), 1977
 In: Mitropolia Banatului, an XXVII, nr. 4–6, aprilie-iunie 1977, pp. 56–62
 Missionary Challenges in Post-Communist contexts, 1997
 Eschatologie et societé aujourd’hui: questions et perspectives. Une approche orthodoxe, (2000)
 In: Irenikon, no.3-4, 2000, pp. 359–373 Eglise locale, 2001
 Spindler, Cerf, Labor et Fides, Clé, Paris/Geneva/Yaoundé, 2001.
 Vocatia ecumenica an Ortodoxiei, 2004

References 

1956 births
Living people
People from Caraș-Severin County
University of Bucharest alumni
Alumni of the University of Birmingham
Romanian theologians
Romanian Orthodox priests
Academic staff of the Lucian Blaga University of Sibiu
People of the World Council of Churches
21st-century Eastern Orthodox theologians